The funeral of Rainier III, Prince of Monaco, took place at the Cathedral of Our Lady Immaculate in Monaco-Ville on 15 April 2005. A heavy smoker, Rainier suffered from chest and lung infections in his final years and was hospitalized numerous times. He was placed in intensive care unit with renal and heart failure in March 2005. He died on 6 April at the age of 81. His only son, Albert, was at his bedside. He was Europe's longest-serving monarch at the time of his death.

Funeral service
Rainier's remains laid in state from 6 April at the Palatine Chapel at the Prince's Palace of Monaco. Members of the public were allowed to file past the coffin to pay their respects. On the day of the funeral, flags flew at half-mast. His coffin was draped in a red and white flag that featured the coat of arms of the House of Grimaldi and the moto Deo Juvante ("With God's Help"). It was borne in a procession of 170-member staff by ten pallbearers chosen from the Prince's Company of Carabineers who carried it from the palace to the cathedral on a 200-metre route. Rainier's children, some of his grandchildren, and other close relatives followed behind. His dog Odin was also included in the procession. The coffin was brought out of the palace via the Gate of Honor, which was symbolically closed afterwards. The band played Beethoven's "Funeral March" as the coffin proceeded through the city and a battery fired 36 gun salutes. The funeral march was chosen by his elder daughter.

The coffin was taken into the cathedral by six officers. Once inside the cathedral, a sword was placed on the coffin, and candles were lit by his family members. Dignitaries and representatives from 60 countries were present for the ceremony, including members of the royal families of Bahrain, Belgium, Bulgaria, Denmark, Egypt, Greece, Japan, Luxembourg, Norway, Saudi Arabia, Spain, Sweden, and the United Kingdom. The 90-minute service was broadcast on television. The music that accompanied the requiem mass included Samuel Barber's Adagio for Strings, which had been previously played at his wife Grace's funeral. The Archbishop of Monaco gave the eulogy, in which he described Rainier as the "builder prince". He went on to add "For all of us, the prince was, of course, the sovereign, but he was also a friend, a member of the family." He also described Rainier and his late wife Princess Grace as "an exceptional couple, united by the heart and spirit." Rainier was buried during a private service attended by close relatives in the family crypt next to his wife, who had died in 1982. Another mass held at the cathedral was attended by members of the public.

Floral tributes were left outside the cathedral by members of the public. 1,300 members of the police from Monaco and France were responsible for providing the security. The harbour was completely sealed off. Monte Carlo Casino and other businesses were also closed on the day of his funeral.

Attendees

Family

House of Grimaldi
 The Prince of Monaco, Prince Rainier's son
 The Princess of Hanover, Prince Rainier's daughter
 Charlotte Casiraghi, Prince Rainier's granddaughter
 Pierre Casiraghi, Prince Rainier's grandson
 Princess Stéphanie of Monaco, Prince Rainier's daughter

Foreign royalty

Members of reigning royal families
  The King of the Belgians
  The Queen of Norway
  The King and Queen of Spain
  The King and Queen of Sweden
  The Duke of York (representing the Queen of the United Kingdom)

Non-royal dignitaries
  President Jacques Chirac, and his wife Bernadette Chirac
  President Mary McAleese

Other notable attendees
 Karl Lagerfeld

References

2005 in Monaco
Funerals by person
Monaco-Ville